SMI may refer to:

Business 
 Service Measurement Index, for IT services
 Swiss Market Index, of the stock market

Companies 
SensoMotoric Instruments, provider of eye tracking hard- and software
Shepardson Microsystems, Atari 8-bit and Apple II software company
SMI, brand of Silicon Motion ICs
Speedway Motorsports (formerly Speedway Motorsports, Inc.), owner and operator of auto racing racetracks and related companies
Shanghai Municipal Investment Group, China
Sony Music India, Hindi music and film production company owned by Sony Music Entertainment

Computing 
 .smi, file extension for  SAMI files
 Scalable Memory Interconnect interface in Intel Xeon E7 processors
 .smi, self mounting image file extension
 Structure of Management Information, in SNMP
 .smi, file extension for Synchronized Multimedia Integration Language
 SMI, system management interrupt for System Management Mode
 Serial Management Interface, to configure an Ethernet PHY

Physics 
 Vertico SMI or Vertico Spatially Modulated Illumination, a fast microscope

Medical 
 Serious Mental Illness

Other uses 
 Sustainable Minerals Institute, Australia
 Sergeant major instructor in the British Army
 Shape Modeling International, annual scientific symposium
 Sports Management International, a fictional sports agency in the film Jerry Maguire
 St. Michael's Institution, a school in Malaysia
 Storage Management Initiative - Specification (SMI-S), a data storage standard
 Samos International Airport, Greece, IATA code
 Support for Mortgage Interest, a UK welfare benefit
Social media intelligence